is manga series created and written Hisashi Yasui and illustrated by Koichi Yamato. Part of Sunrise's Gundam Franchise, it was first serialized in Kodansha's Shōnen magazine Comic BomBom from August 20, 1982 until December 17, 1986, compiling up to 15 Tankobon volumes.

Plamo-Kyoshiro marks as the first spinoff in the Gundam franchise outside of the Universal Century timeline, and the first series to use the concept of battles using customized Gunpla which later been used in other productions of the franchise.

Plot
The story of Plamo-Kyoshiro is about Shiro Kyoda, a young boy from Tamiya City and a student of the Bandai Elementary School. Shiro is an enthusiast of plastic model kits and "Plamo Simulation", a plastic model battle game. Shiro's dream is to become the representative of Japan in the World Simulation Tournament and be able to fight in the finals in the Battle of Hobbytopia. In addition to that, the manga contained original designs that would later inspire the Mobile Suit Variations and BB Senshi series.

Production
Plamo-Kyoshiro was written by Hisashi Yasui and illustrated by Koichi Yamato. In 1981 Kodansha had released the first issue of its magazine Comic Bom Bom. At that moment, the publisher was planning to launch a manga adaptation of the Mobile Suit Gundam movies, but the publisher was unable to get Sunrise's permission at the time. As an alternative plan, the publisher contacted Hisashi Yasui to create a new series, thus creating Plamo-Kyoshiro. Furthermore, the Plamo-Kyoshiro manga was created as a tool to publicize the Gundam plastic models that Bandai was launching at the time.

Plastic models from other popular franchises also make appearances in Plamo-Kyoshiro, including those from Votoms, Dunbine, Dougram, Vifam, L-Gaim, Xabungle, Baldios, Star Wars, The Exorcist, Thunderbirds and Blue Thunder. More standard models such as those of airplanes, tanks and other vehicles make appearances. In addition, the characters appear customizing and creating their own original models of Vehicles and Robots. The manga also includes many references to real life companies and figures involved in the plastic model kit industry.

Media

Manga
The original edition had 15 volumes and was in publication from August 20, 1982 until December 17, 1986 in Comic Bom Bom magazine by Kodansha. In 1989 a standalone volume was published entitled "Plamo-Kyoshiro-Musha Gundam Version". In 1990 a second edition of 11 volumes was launched. In 1999 a 6-volume deluxe edition was published. Between 2002 and 2004 a cheaper version of 13 volumes was published and in the year 2008 a paperback edition of 10 volumes was published. All Plamo-Kyoshiro publications, from the original 1982 until the last of 2008 have been published by Kodansha. The manga has also received several sequels and derivatives.

The success of Plamo Kyoshiro marked a trend at the time of its publication and several publishers wanted to have a manga based on battles of plastic models. Coro Coro Comic launched a few similar-themed manga such as Plamo Tensai Esper Taro, 3D Koshien Plamo Daisaku, Majin Eiyuuden Wataru and Majin Kaihatsu Daisakusen. Hobby Boy Hitto-kun was another manga that was published in Terebi Magazine 2 (a sister magazine to Comic Bom Bom).

Merchendise
Bandai released several plastic models based on the mobile suits in the manga during its publication. Years later, Bandai released Master Grade Models based on both the Perfect Gundam and the Perfect Zeon, while later created the short-lived Kyoshiro Maniax line of Gundam FIX Figuration figures. The Perfect Gundam and the Red Warrior were also released under Bandai Spirit's Robot Spirits line of posable premium figures.

See also
Gundam model

External links

Plamo-Kyoshiro In Kodansha Comics Web

Gundam anime and manga
Kodansha manga
Shōnen manga